FHS may refer to:

Schools

United States 
 Falmouth High School, Maine
 Farmington High School, Utah
 Fife High School, Fife, Washington
 Firestone High School, Akron, Ohio
 Flushing High School, Queens, New York
 Forks High School, Washington
 Framingham High School, Massachusetts
 Frenship High School, Wolfforth, Texas

Canada 
 Frank Hurt Secondary School, Surrey, British Columbia
 Fredericton High School, New Brunswick

Health and medicine 
 Feline hyperesthesia syndrome
 Fetal hydantoin syndrome
 Floating–Harbor syndrome

Other uses 
 Fellow of the Horticultural Society
 Filesystem Hierarchy Standard
 Hasselt railway station, in Belgium
 Front handspring